University of Nebraska High School (UNHS) is an accredited, university-based online high school institution operated by the University of Nebraska, in the United States. It offers distance education high school courses which allows its students to earn high school credit or a diploma from anywhere in the world.

History
University of Nebraska High School was established by the University of Nebraska in 1929. Initially courses were paper-based, correspondence study. Since that time — and with the arrival of the Internet — the high school's curriculum has evolved into an innovative and interactive learning environment.

After several decades as the University of Nebraska-Lincoln Independent Study High School, in July 2013 UNHS was brought under the University of Nebraska's system-wide online initiative, University of Nebraska Online Worldwide. With this transition the school's name was changed to University of Nebraska High School.

Today
University of Nebraska High School now offers more than 100 core, elective and Advanced Placement courses in eight subject areas. Courses are provided online and in print. Courses are designed to be flexible and self-paced, which allow its students to study at their convenience. With students in all 50 U.S. states and more than 100 countries, the University of Nebraska High School has delivered hundreds of thousands of courses to a highly diverse student body.

Accreditation
University of Nebraska High School is accredited by:
 Nebraska Department of Education since 1967
 AdvancEd (North Central Association) since 1978

Additionally, core and Advanced Placement courses are approved by:
 National Collegiate Athletic Association (NCAA) for students seeking eligibility (UNHS code 281316)
 UNHS’ AP® courses are approved by the College Board.

Under Nebraska law, it is classified as a school district.

Notable alumni
 Britney Spears
 Justin Timberlake
 Andy Roddick
 Shane Gersich

See also
 University of Missouri High School
 Indiana University High School
 Stanford University Online High School

References

External links
 https://highschool.nebraska.edu/

Distance education institutions based in the United States
Educational institutions established in 1929
Public high schools in Nebraska
School districts in Nebraska
University-affiliated schools in the United States
1929 establishments in Nebraska
University of Nebraska System